The following lists events that happened during 1988 in Sri Lanka.

Incumbents
President: J. R. Jayewardene
Prime Minister: Ranasinghe Premadasa
Chief Justice: Suppiah Sharvananda (until 6 June); Parinda Ranasinghe (starting 6 June)

Governors
Governor of Central Province: E. L. B. Hurulle (starting June)
Governor of North Central Province: Dingiri Bandara Welagedara (starting May)
Governor of North Eastern Province: Nalin Seneviratne (starting 30 November)
Governor of North Western Province: Dingiri Banda Wijetunga (starting 1 June)
Governor of Sabaragamuwa: Noel Wimalasena (starting 30 April)
Governor of Southern Province: Abdul Bakeer Markar (starting 13 June)
Governor of Uva: P. C. Imbulana (starting May)
Governor of Western Province: Suppiah Sharvananda (starting 6 June)

Chief Ministers
Chief Minister of Central Province: W. M. P. B. Dissanayake (starting 9 June)
Chief Minister of North Central Province: G. D. Mahindasoma (starting 2 May)
Chief Minister of North Eastern Province: Varatharaja Perumal (starting 10 December)
Chief Minister of North Western Province: Gamini Jayawickrama Perera (starting 4 May)
Chief Minister of Sabaragamuwa: G. V. Punchinilame (starting April)
Chief Minister of Southern Province: M. S. Amarasiri (starting 16 June)
Chief Minister of Uva: Percy Samaraweera (starting May)
Chief Minister of Western Province: Susil Moonesinghe (starting 9 June)

Events
 In the north and east, soldiers of the Indian Peace Keeping Force battled Tamil Tiger rebels.
 In the south, government death squads are engaged with equally brutal militants of the radical JVP party.
 Sri Lanka starts their 9th parliamentary elections.

Deaths
 February 12 – S. Nadarajah, Tamil lawyer and politician
 February 16 – Vijaya Kumaratunga, Sri Lankan actor and politician (b. 1945)
 June 6 – Chandra Fernando, Roman Catholic priest and venerable (assassinated) (b. 1942)

Notes

a.  Gunaratna, Rohan. (1998). Pg.353, Sri Lanka's Ethnic Crisis and National Security, Colombo: South Asian Network on Conflict Research.

References